MWC Barcelona (formerly but still commonly referred to as Mobile World Congress) is an annual trade show organised by GSMA, dedicated primarily to the mobile communications industry.

The event is held in Barcelona, Catalonia, Spain at the Fira de Barcelona Gran Via, usually in February or early-March. It is attended primarily by device manufacturers, network equipment providers, representatives of wireless carriers, and the press, among others. Its annual attendance is generally around 100,000 people, while mobile phone manufacturers often use the conference to unveil upcoming devices.

GSMA has extended the MWC brand to two other trade shows in Shanghai, China (MWC Shanghai) and Las Vegas, United States (MWC Las Vegas, formerly MWC Los Angeles), but the brand remains most synonymous with the Barcelona event.

History

The name of the event has evolved over the years. The event's origin traces back to a business conference on "Pan Europe Digital Cellular Radio" (the original working name of the GSM mobile system) held in Brussels in 1987.

The name "GSM World Congress" was first used in 1990 when the event was held in Rome. For the next few years, the event moved to a new city each time, passing through Nice, Berlin, Lisbon, Athens, and Madrid, before setting in 1996 in Cannes. The event was held in Cannes for ten consecutive years, with the name evolving to 3GSM World Congress from 2003.

In 2006, the event moved to Barcelona, held at the Fira de Barcelona Montjuïc. In 2008 the GSM Association, which had been formed in 1996 and had taken an increasing interest in the event, completed the purchase of the show with the name changing to Mobile World Congress for the first time. The GSMA endorsed the International Mobile Gaming Awards in 2008, which were held at the event from then until 2012. In 2011, GSMA announced a long-term deal to continue hosting the event in Barcelona through 2023.

Starting in 2013, Mobile World Congress has been held at the Fira de Barcelona Gran Via.

In February 2020, a large number of vendors announced plans to withdraw from the then-upcoming show, tentatively scheduled for 24–27 February, due to concerns over the COVID-19 pandemic (which are magnified by the strong Chinese presence in the telecom industry). This included major vendors and operators such as Deutsche Telekom, Ericsson, Intel, LG, Nokia, STMicroelectronics, Vivo, and Vodafone. On 11 February 2020, it was reported that GSMA was considering cancelling the event entirely; health measures were already to be instituted, including a requirement for Chinese attendees to undergo a two-week quarantine prior to the event, as well as body temperature checks of attendees. Chinese vendor Huawei, as well as Samsung, announced plans to remain with a reduced presence, with Huawei primarily sending its European executives only.  On 12 February 2020, GSMA CEO John Hoffman announced that MWC 2020 had been cancelled, stating that the event had become "impossible" to host under these conditions.

In April 2020, it was announced that Barcelona will continue hosting the event until 2024 as a consequence of cancellation of MWC 2020.

On 23 September 2020, due to continuous threat that COVID-19 will affect the 2021 event, the GSMA announced that is postponing the Mobile World Congress Barcelona to the last week of June.

As of 17 March 2021, GSMA states the 2021 edition will still proceed with a controlled maximum attendees of 50,000. So far, at least 10 large exhibitors have announced their withdrawal including Ericsson, Nokia, Facebook, Sony and Cisco. BT was the first Tier 1 telco to announce their withdrawal.

In 2022, from 28 February to 3 March, The Mobile World Congress is scheduled. The mobile technology convention is currently anticipating over 1,800 attendees and exhibitors from 183 countries. All participants must have a PCR test or vaccination certificate to take part in congress.

International editions 
In 2015, GSMA's Mobile Asia Expo was renamed Mobile World Congress Shanghai.

In 2016, CTIA announced a partnership with GSMA to replace its annual Super Mobility trade show for the U.S. wireless industry with Mobile World Congress Americas, beginning 2017. The event was first held in San Francisco, before moving to Los Angeles for 2018.

Gallery

References

External links

 

1987 establishments in Spain
Recurring events established in 1987
Telecommunication conferences
Telecommunications organizations
Tourist attractions in Barcelona
Trade fairs in Spain
Wireless